Tina Shelton is a United States television and stage personality. She is remembered mainly as a news anchor and reporter at KHON-TV in Honolulu, Hawaii; the state's Fox affiliate. Shelton is also a theatrical actress. She has appeared on various live theatrical productions.

News Service
Shelton has been a mainstay in Hawaii television newsreporting for 32 years.  She worked at KHVH news radio, KGMB-TV, KITV and KHON-TV.  She was known for her investigative reporting and covering the Federal District Court of the Hawaii District.

Awards
Shelton is a graduate of the UH journalism program (Kapiolani Community College and UH-Manoa) and was recognized as an "Outstanding Young Alumna" in the U.H. Distinguished Alumni Awards in 1989. Her work has been nominated for regional Emmy awards, and she has won several local reporting awards.
Shelton is the only journalist to be recognized as a U.H. Distinguished Alumni.

Theatrical Productions
Shelton is active in the Community Theater.  She is well known as her role as Mrs. Anna Leonowens in the Rodgers and Hammerstein play The King and I.  Shelton has also headlined in the local productions of Guys and Dolls and Camelot.
Shelton is currently preparing for another headline role in the Musical Once Upon a Mattress with the Army Community Theater.

John A. Burns School of Medicine
On June 27, 2007, Shelton was appointed the Director of Public Relations for the John A. Burns School of Medicine (JABSOM) at the University of Hawai’i at Manoa.

Family
Tina Shelton is married to Steve- Beaudry.  They were married on July 30, 1994 in Honolulu Hawaii.

References

American television personalities
American women television personalities
Living people
Year of birth missing (living people)